Santa Maria is an operetta, or 'comic opera', in three acts with music and lyrics by Oscar Hammerstein I.  It opened at Hammerstein's Olympia Theatre in New York City on September 14, 1896.  After closing on December 19, 1896, it went on tour, starting at the Alvin Theatre in Pittsburgh, Pennsylvania, on December 21, 1896.  

The final scene, in which Bertrand and Santa Maria are proclaimed future King and Queen, was set as a "Palace of Ice" constructed from aluminum, a novel design for 1896.  Edna May, who would soon become a star in Edwardian musical comedies, made her Broadway debut in the piece.

Plot
Act 1 – Holland in the 18th century
The protagonist, as an infant, was found in a forest by Santa, a bird catcher.  He named her Maria and raised her to train birds.  As she is somewhat of a vixen, her jocular neighbors reversed her name to Santa Maria.  Meanwhile, the childless King of Holland is about to be divorced at the demand of some conspirators, when a gypsy is bribed to reveal to him that he has a son, born twenty years before, while he was away at war.  This infant had been stolen from its cradle, and Lieutenant Bertrand, a young officer who has been sentenced to death, volunteers to go in search of the lost Prince.

Act 2 – Zambazoo, Italy  
Three years later, Bertrand is in Italy, where he is imprisoned for kissing an old woman by mistake.  A tailor is also imprisoned for spoiling a dress and is to be tried by a jury of women. Bertrand bribes the tailor to change identities with him and is ordered by the jury to try the dress on Santa Maria, the complainant.  On Santa Maria's arm he discovers the birthmark, a lily and a crown, that proves her to be the child of the King of Holland he has been seeking for three years – a daughter rather than a son.  The two fall in love, and Bertram is pardoned.

Act 3 – Holland  
Bertrand and Santa Maria return home to Holland and are proclaimed the future King and Queen.

Roles and original cast

Reception
The New York Times noted the audience's enthusiastic response to the piece and commented, "There is elemental strength, and humor too, in some of the situations here developed....  The first act is deliciously naïve....  But there is some fun in it, and plenty of jingle and color....  Mr. Hammerstein is scarcely a Sullivan or Suppe.  Nor is he, as a librettist, a rival of Gilbert.  But he is a man of extraordinary versatility and wonderful energy, who is doing much in a cheerful and vigorous way to entertain his fellow-citizens.  There is good reason for his popularity."

Hammerstein biographer Vincent Sheean summed up the composer's experience with Santa Maria:

The failure of the work was not quite so overwhelming as that of [Hammerstein's] Marguerite, perhaps because Hammerstein had spent a great deal of money on its production. He had an orchestra of fifty-five in the pit, for example, which was about twice the size of the usual musical-comedy orchestra. His principals were expensive, his costumes and settings lavish. (An odd touch in the decor, which Arthur recalled, was a scene made of papier-mâché, with peaks like mountains, covered with tinfoil. By the end of the first week the foil began to turn black and had to be refreshed regularly with paint.)...  The critics saw redeeming features in Santa Maria, and for a few days there was some hope that it might attract a public. That hope was vain, and in the end – after more than fair trial – it brought its author, composer, and producer less than ten per cent of the actual cash he had spent on it.  In his rage at the failure of his opera, Oscar accused his sons Willie and Arthur of standing outside the theater and stopping would-be patrons from buying tickets.

Song list
Down by the Hillside I Met Her
Divorce Song
Eskimo's Song
Let Us Jolly Be
Santa Maria, My Joy, My Pride
Bring Back to Me My Childhood Days
When I Found My First One Gray Hair

Notes

References
Brown, Thomas Allston. A History of the New York Stage: From the First Performance in 1732 to 1901.  New York: Dodd, Mead and Company, 1903. Digitized Oct 25, 2005
Sheean, Vincent.  Oscar Hammerstein I: The Life and Exploits of an Impresario. New York: Simon and Schuster, 1956.

External links

Dispute between D'Arville and Hammerstein, The New York Times, November 14, 1896, p. 3

English-language operettas
1896 operas
Operas by Oscar Hammerstein I
Operas